Amanda Doman (born 24 October 1977 in Gladstone, Queensland) is a softball player from Australia, who won a silver medal at the 2004 Summer Olympics.

References

External links
 
 
 

1977 births
Australian softball players
Living people
Olympic softball players of Australia
Softball players at the 2004 Summer Olympics
Olympic silver medalists for Australia
Sportswomen from Queensland
Olympic medalists in softball
Medalists at the 2004 Summer Olympics
People from Gladstone, Queensland